Alexandra Hills Australian Football Club is an Australian rules football club which competed in the SEQAFL Div 2.  The club is now a first division contender.

History
The Alexandra Hills Football Club was formed in 1980, under the original name of "The Capalaba Australian rules Football Club" and debuted in the SQAFA 2nd division in 1981.  After the team play in four Grand Finals in four years the club was promoted to division one in 1998, the club stayed until another restructure of the competition saw them placed in QSFL First Division in 2001.

In 2009 they lost the first division Grand Final to Wynnum by 4 points. Another restructure in 2012 has them playing in SEQAFL Division 2.

Premierships
 BAFL Div 2  – 1995, 1996
 AFLQ Div 2 North Reserves - 2020, 2021

References

External links
 Official website

Alexandra Hills
1980 establishments in Australia
Australian rules football clubs established in 1980